Keperra is a suburb in the City of Brisbane, Queensland, Australia.

Geography 
The railway line running east between Keperra, Grovely, Oxford Park and Mitchelton was recently duplicated. This work was completed in 2008. Grovely is a locality within the suburb of Keperra. The Brisbane Institute of Tertiary and Further Education (TAFE) Grovely Campus is located within Keperra as is the Arana Leagues Club on Dawson Parade near the border with the suburb of Arana Hills.

History
Keperra has a deep and rich indigenous history. The name Keperra comes from a Yuggera words kipper/kippa indicating a young man. Two bora rings used to be located within the suburb, one near the corner of Samford Road and Keperra Street (now under housing) and one which disappeared with the construction of the Keperra Country Club. It is thought that the name derives from the initiation ceremonies of young men performed at the bora rings.

In 1865 Thomas Price sold a large portion of land in Keperra to John and Mary Nicholson who built a home and named it Groveley Lodge (the extra 'e' in the name was dropped in later years). In the absence of a church in the area, the Nicholsons held services within Groveley Lodge and later built St Matthews Anglican Church, Grovely in what is now Church Street, Mitchelton; John and Mary Nicholson are buried in the churchyard cemetery.

The railway was built through the area in 1918 but it was originally a siding located near the western end of the Keperra Country Club. The Keperra railway station was named in 1932.

On Saturday 26 October 1918, 107 allotments of the "Grovely Station Estate" were advertised for auction by W.J. Down & Co.  The allotments were adjacent to the Grovely Railway Station on the Enoggera line.

Capt. Robert H Cottam founded the Keperra Golf Club in 1931. It was originally called the Enoggera Golf Club, but changed to its present name in 1940. The clubhouse was built in 1939–1940.

In about 1940 a military camp was established on the slaughterhouse site. The army camp constructed many of the roads and much of the land was transferred to the Housing Commission for housing development in 1951.

From 1966 to 1998 there was a drive-in movie theatre located at the corner of Settlement and Samford Roads. It was operated by R.W.P. Dodd Theatres and later by Birch Carol & Coyle. It could accommodate 650 cars. Initially it had a single screen but was later converted to a two-screen. The land is now the site of the Kings Grove housing estate, located within the Kings Park Estate.

The median age of the Keperra population was 37 years, the same as the national median. 80.3% of people living in Keperra were born in Australia, compared to the national average of 69.8%; the next most common countries of birth were England 3.9%, New Zealand 2.4%, Scotland 0.7%, Philippines 0.6%, South Africa 0.6%. 90.2% of people spoke only English at home; the next most common languages were 0.6% Italian, 0.5% Cantonese, 0.4% Arabic, 0.4% Spanish, 0.3% Filipino.

Economy
There is a large quarry at 469 Settlement Road, where extractive activities are still in operation as at 2021, but it is planned to convert the quarry site into a housing estate.

Education
Grovely State School is a government primary (Prep-6) school for boys and girls at 200 Dawson Parade. In 2018, the school had an enrolment of 375 students with 26 teachers (23 full-time equivalent) and 22 non-teaching staff (11 full-time equivalent). It includes a special education program.

Mitchelton State High School Positive Learning Centre is a specific-purpose primary and secondary (4-12) school at 83 Gilston Street. It is for students who require intervention beyond the capacity of a conventional classroom with goal of returning them into mainstream schooling or into vocational programs.

There is no mainstream secondary school in Keperra. The nearest government secondary schools are Ferny Grove State High School in neighbouring Ferny Grove to the west and Mitchelton State High School in neighbouring Mitchelton to the east.

Amenities
The suburb has a 27-hole Championship golf course (Keperra Country Club), football (soccer) club Westside FC, shopping centres (Great Western and two smaller ones at Dallas Parade near the Keperra station and on Dawson Parade near Grovely station), churches, a hospital, and a dog off-leash area.  An area of vegetation known as Keperra Bushland bounds the suburb to the south on its border with The Gap while the Keperra Picnic Grounds are located in the north-west section at the intersection of Samford Road and Upper Kedron Road.

The Great Western Shopping Centre is at the intersection of Settlement Road and Samford Road. Bunnings Warehouse opened in 2018 with further retail to open in 2019.

Housing
Housing within the suburb ranges from modest post-war homes built from weatherboard and mainly located on the northern side of Samford Road and south of the railway to larger brick dwellings built during the 1980s and 1990s within the Kings Park Estate. The Estate began to be developed around 1988 in an area around Samford Road, Cobalt Street and Onyx Street. Properties in the southern sections (e.g. Balvenie Street) of the Estate date from the early 1990s.

Keperra Sanctuary Retirement Village is at 998 Samford Road, just east of the Great Western Shopping Centre.

Transport
Keperra railway station and Grovely railway station provides access to regular Queensland Rail City network services to Ferny Grove, Brisbane and Beenleigh.

Brisbane Transport offers a bus service on Route 362 between The Gap and Brookside Shopping Centre with stops at Great Western Shopping Centre, Keperra railway station, Grovely railway station and Mitchelton railway station.

The bus service on Route 398 is between Mitchelton railway station and Ferny Grove railway station, with stops within Keperra.

References

External links

 
 
 
 Keperra Country Club

Suburbs of the City of Brisbane